Barbados competed at the 2012 Summer Paralympics in London, United Kingdom from August 29 to September 9, 2012.

Swimming

Men

See also

 Barbados at the 2012 Summer Olympics

References

Nations at the 2012 Summer Paralympics
2012
Paralympics